Mike Nicholas Sango (born 5 December 1955) is a Zimbabwean diplomat, Major general (rtd) and Zimbabwe's ambassador to Russia. He served in the Zimbabwe Liberation War as a member of the ZANLA from 1975 to 1980, which led to the country's attainment of independence and multiracial democracy.

Sango was attested in the army and held various high-level posts such as military adviser in Zimbabwe’s Permanent Mission to the United Nations, international instructor in the Southern African Development Community (SADC) on the laws of armed conflict and war, director of operations in the SADC Multinational Force in the Democratic Republic of Congo, brigade commander and other military staff appointments.

He was appointed Zimbabwe's ambassador to the Russian Federation in July 2015.

He holds a Masters in International Relations from University of Zimbabwe and a Masters in Business Administration from the Zimbabwe Open University.

References

External links
 Official Twitter Account of the Ambassador of Zimbabwe to the Russian Federation

Living people
Zimbabwean military personnel
University of Zimbabwe alumni
Zimbabwe Open University alumni
1955 births
Zimbabwe African National Liberation Army personnel
Ambassadors of Zimbabwe to Russia
Permanent Representatives of Zimbabwe to the United Nations